This is a list of earthquakes in 2015. Only earthquakes of magnitude 6 or above are included, unless they result in damage and/or casualties, or are notable for some other reason.  All dates are listed according to UTC (Coordinated Universal Time) time. This year was dominated by the earthquake in Nepal in April, with around 9,000 deaths. Another deadly event struck Afghanistan, while the strongest quake (8.3) took place in Chile, like in 2014. Malaysia was struck by a 6.0 earthquake which killed 18 climbers including Singaporean students. It is marked as the deadliest in the country.

Compared to other years

2015

By death toll

By magnitude

By month

January

Additional damage occurred to buildings already affected by the 2.3 magnitude quake a few days prior.
Several schools were severely damaged in Barahona.
 A magnitude 3.0 earthquake struck Dominican Republic near the town of Puerto Alejandro on January 14 at an unknown depth. This was an aftershock of the 4.7 quake the day before. No damage was reported, but two people were killed in an accident caused by the quake at a salt mine near Puerto Alejandro.
The earthquake injured at least 11 people.
At least three houses were damaged in Bursa.

February

 A magnitude 3.8 earthquake struck Cuzco, Peru on February 4. Around 200 homes were severely damaged, displacing 1,500 people.
 A magnitude 5.0 earthquake struck Sichuan, China on February 6 at a depth of 10.0 km (6.2 mi). At least 1,055 houses were damaged or destroyed, affecting 3,700 people. Power outages also occurred.
 A magnitude 4.8 earthquake struck Ilam Province, Iran on February 15 at a depth of 10.0 km (6.2 mi). Three people were injured and several homes were damaged.
Some damage was caused in Paama, where a small tsunami was observed.
This was an aftershock of the 6.7 magnitude quake.
 A magnitude 4.5 earthquake struck Yunnan, China on February 20 at a depth of 10.0 km (6.2 mi). 276 houses were destroyed and 3,374 others were damaged, and around 5 km (3.1 mi) of a road were damaged by landslides.
This was an aftershock of the 6.7 magnitude quake.
Four miners were killed and another was injured when a landslide occurred in Tuzla.
The earthquake injured at least 15 people and caused some damage.
Hundreds of homes were damaged in Flores, some severely.

March

Nine people were injured, 286 houses were destroyed and 226 others were damaged in parts of the country, including the capital Bogotá.
 A magnitude 4.6 earthquake struck Anhui, China on March 14 at a depth of 10.0 km (6.2 mi). Two people were killed by a collapsing wall and thirteen others were injured. 155 houses collapsed and 11,079 others were damaged.
A "small" tsunami was reported in Rabaul harbor and a  tsunami in the Solomon Islands.
Over 5,000 houses were destroyed and 20,000 others were damaged in the earthquake, and four people were injured.
This was a foreshock of the 6.5 magnitude quake.
This was a foreshock of the 6.5 magnitude quake.
This was an aftershock of the 7.5 magnitude quake.

April

 A magnitude 4.9 earthquake struck Uttarakhand, India on April 1 at a depth of 10.0 km (6.2 mi). Eight people, including five children were injured by falling debris and two homes collapsed, with 500 others damaged.
This was an aftershock of the 6.5 magnitude quake in March.
 A magnitude 5.4 earthquake struck Gansu, China at a depth of 10.0 km (6.2 mi). One person was killed by a landslide and fifteen others were injured. 538 houses were destroyed and 95,872 others were damaged.
One person was killed in a house fire caused by the earthquake in the Hsinchuang District of New Taipei.
This was an aftershock of the 6.4 magnitude quake.
This was an aftershock of the 6.4 magnitude quake.
This was an aftershock of the 7.8 magnitude quake.
This was an aftershock of the 7.8 magnitude quake.
This was an aftershock of the 7.8 magnitude quake.
Dozens of buildings were damaged in the state of West Bengal in neighboring India, including a school. This earthquake was not an aftershock of the April 2015 Nepal earthquake a few days prior.
Two people were injured as well as some damage was caused.
Five people were injured as well as some damage like cracked or collapsed walls and broken windows were observed.
Several houses were destroyed, and power outages occurred in Rabaul. This was a foreshock of the 7.5 magnitude quake in May.

May

This was a foreshock of the 7.5 magnitude quake.
This was a foreshock of the 7.5 magnitude quake.
Four people were killed in a landslide in Barpak, while one person was slightly injured when a house collapsed. It is an aftershock of the 7.8 quake on April 25.
This was a foreshock of the 7.5 magnitude quake.
Further damage in Rabaul; widespread power outages, cracked walls, and partially collapsed homes. A tsunami estimated at under  was reported in New Britain.
This was a major aftershock of the 7.5 magnitude quake.
Nepalese authorities reported 153 dead, while 62 were killed in India, two in Bangladesh, and one in the Tibet Autonomous Region of China. This was a major aftershock of the 7.8 magnitude quake in April.
This was an aftershock of the 7.3 magnitude quake.
Windows shattered, several homes partially collapsed, and cracks appeared in the walls of a school.
Cracks appeared in the walls of several hundred homes.
One person was killed by a collapsing wall in Bihar, India, while another died of a heart attack. This was an aftershock of the 7.3 magnitude quake.
This was a foreshock of the 6.2 magnitude quake.
This was a foreshock of the 6.9 magnitude quake.
About 50 buildings were severely damaged in Khorramabad.
This was an aftershock of the 6.9 magnitude quake.
Two people were injured.
The Associated Press agency reported "twelve people suffered minor injuries", and TEPCO claimed that 400 customers lost electricity in Saitama Prefecture. 
This was an aftershock of the 6.2 magnitude quake.

June

Eighteen people died and several were injured in rockfalls while ascending Mount Kinabalu.
This was an aftershock of the 6.2 magnitude quake in May.
Cracks in walls and falling objects were reported near the epicentre.

July

Three people were killed, 71 were injured and about 3,000 homes destroyed or damaged.
One person died of a heart attack in Balingasag and minor damage was observed in Del Carmen, Surigao del Norte.
The earthquake killed 3 people.
One teenager was killed and some buildings were damaged.

August

One policeman died in a building collapse in Kabare, and two children died in a house fire caused by the quake.
This was an aftershock of the 6.6 magnitude quake.

September

A pregnant woman was killed by a collapsing wall.
Thirteen people were killed, six are missing and one million were evacuated in Chile. One man died, some damage and rockslides were observed in Argentina.
This was an aftershock of the 8.3 magnitude quake.
This was an aftershock of the 8.3 magnitude quake.
This was an aftershock of the 8.3 magnitude quake.
This was a major aftershock of the 8.3 magnitude quake.
This was an aftershock of the 8.3 magnitude quake.
This was an aftershock of the 8.3 magnitude quake.
This was an aftershock of the 8.3 magnitude quake.
This was an aftershock of the 8.3 magnitude quake.
This was an aftershock of the 8.3 magnitude quake.
This was an aftershock of the 8.3 magnitude quake.
This was an aftershock of the 8.3 magnitude quake.
This was an aftershock of the 8.3 magnitude quake.
This was an aftershock of the 8.3 magnitude quake.
About 60 people were injured while 200 buildings were damaged.
This was an aftershock of the 8.3 magnitude quake.

October

A woman was killed and many buildings were damaged in El Galpón, including a school.
Slight damage occurred in Yekaterinburg, where the window panes of a school was broken. A dam was also cracked in Pervouralsk. It is one of the strongest earthquakes in the area in years, and the first one to be felt there since 2010.
Minor to buildings in several villages in the epicentral area, including a mosque. Two landslides also occurred.
 A magnitude 5.6 earthquake struck Punjab, Pakistan on October 23 at a depth of 11.0 km (6.8 mi). Two people were killed, one by a collapsing house, another due to a heart-attack. Another person was injured, with dozens of adobe houses destroyed.
Destruction occurred mainly in Afghanistan and Pakistan on houses. At least 280 people were killed in Pakistan, 115 in Afghanistan and 4 in India, with more than 2,300 injured. The tremor was also strongly felt in India and Tajikistan, lighter in Kyrgyzstan and Kazakhstan. At least 14 people in Tajikistan suffered injuries.

November

Minor damage was reported.
The earthquake damaged some buildings and triggered rockfalls, killing one man and injuring 4 others.
This was an Aftershock of the 8.3 magnitude quake in September.
This was an Aftershock of the 8.3 Quake in September. The Pacific Tsunami Warning Center reported a  tsunami at Coquimbo and a  tsunami at Huasco in Atacama Region.
This was an aftershock of the 8.3 magnitude quake in September.
The Japan Meteorological Agency reported a  tsunami at Nakanoshima island in Kagoshima Prefecture.
Two women were killed in house collapses in Ponti and Athani on Lefkada; the quake also damaged the main road in the southwestern part of Lefkada and several buildings and a landslide in Egremni Beach occurred.
 A magnitude 3.2 earthquake struck Central Java, Indonesia on November 21. A construction worker died when he fell from a building.
A woman and her child were killed when their house collapsed in Khyber Pakhtunkhwa, Pakistan, and dozens of houses were destroyed in Afghanistan.
One man was killed by rockfalls triggered by the earthquake.
Two workers were killed, buried by a mudslide.
Many buildings were evacuated due to the shaking, and some houses suffered light damage in Manaus, Brazil.
This was probably a doublet of the 7.6 magnitude quake earlier.
This was an aftershock of the 7.6 magnitude quake in Peru.

December

One truck driver and a policeman were killed while dozens more were injured and 500 homes destroyed. The earthquake was also felt in Kyrgyzstan, Afghanistan, Pakistan, Kazakhstan and India.
Two people were killed in Cocotitlan and landslides occurred in Santa Fe.
At least seven houses were damaged, two of them collapsed.
Four people were killed in Pakistan. At least 100 people were injured. The quake was also strongly felt in Tajikistan and India.

References

2015
 
Earthquakes
2015